Three referendums were held in Liechtenstein during 1930. The first was held on 2 March 1930 on introducing a proportional representation system for Landtag elections, and was rejected by 60.6% of voters. The second was held on 26 October on a new media law passed by the Landtag, and rejected by just three votes. The third on 14 December concerned the building of an inland channel, and was approved by 70.5% of voters.

Results

Introduction of proportional representation

New media law

Construction of an inland channel

References

1930 referendums
1930 in Liechtenstein
Referendums in Liechtenstein